Deshazor Dontee’ Everett (born February 22, 1992) is an American football strong safety and special teamer who is a free agent. He played college football at Texas A&M. He signed as an undrafted free agent with the Tampa Bay Buccaneers in 2015 before joining the Washington Redskins that same year. Everett was released by Washington in 2021 after a car crash led to the death of his girlfriend. He was originally charged with involuntary manslaughter before was dropped to reckless driving, which he pleaded guilty to.

Professional career

Tampa Bay Buccaneers
On May 5, 2015, the Tampa Bay Buccaneers signed Everett to a three-year, 1.48 million contract.

Throughout organized team activities with the Buccaneers, he competed for a roster spot as a backup cornerback against Mike Jenkins, Isaiah Frey, Sterling Moore, C. J. Wilson, and Leonard Johnson. On July 29, 2015, the Buccaneers waived Everett.

Washington Redskins / Football Team
Everett signed with the Washington Redskins on August 1, 2015. On September 7, 2015, Everett was waived but re-joined the team's practice squad the following day. On October 3, 2015, the Redskins promoted Everett to the active roster.

He made his debut in the team's 23–20 victory against the Philadelphia Eagles in Week 4. On October 18, 2015, Everett recorded his first career tackle on linebacker Trevor Riley while covering a kickoff in the second quarter of the Redskins' 34–20 loss at the New York Jets. In Week 10, he collected a season-high five combined tackles during a 47–14 victory against the New Orleans Saints. The following week, Everett made one tackle before leaving the Redskins' 44–16 loss at the Carolina Panthers in the second quarter due to a hamstring injury. The injury sidelined him for the next two games (Week 13–14).

On January 10, 2016, Everett appeared in his first career playoff game and recorded a solo tackle during their 35–18 loss to the Green Bay Packers in the NFC Wildcard Game.

2016
During training camp, Everett opted to switch to safety. Head coach Jay Gruden named Everett the third free safety on the depth chart, behind DeAngelo Hall and Will Blackmon.

He was promoted to backup free safety after DeAngelo Hall tore his ACL in his right knee and starting strong safety David Bruton was placed on injured reserve in Week 4. On December 11, 2016, Everett recorded a tackle and made his first career interception off a pass by Carson Wentz during a 27–22 victory at the Philadelphia Eagles in Week 14. On December 15, 2016, the NFL fined him $48,000 for two penalties during special teams plays in the fourth quarter of their victory against the Eagles. His first $24,000 fine was for hitting a defenseless player penalty he committed on Eagles' running back Darren Sproles during a punt return. His second $24,000 fine was for an illegal blindside block on tight end Brent Celek during a Redskins' punt return. In Week 15, Everett collected two solo tackles in the Redskins' 26–15 loss to the Carolina Panthers. He finished his first season as a safety with 11 solo tackles, a pass deflection, and an interception in 16 games and zero starts.

2017
Throughout training camp, Everett competed for a spot as a backup safety against Will Blackmon, Earl Wolff, Josh Evans, Montae Nicholson, Stefan McClure, and Fish Smithson. Defensive coordinator Greg Manusky named Everett the starting strong safety, alongside free safety D. J. Swearinger, after Su'a Cravens announced his decision to retire a week before their season-opener.

He made his first career start in the Washington Redskins' season-opener against the Philadelphia Eagles and recorded seven combined tackles in their 30–17 loss. After Week 3, rookie Montae Nicholson started in place of Everett after he sustained a sprained MCL. Nicholson remained the starting strong safety after performing well in Everett's absence. Everett entered the game for base packages while Nicholson was used for nickel packages. In Week 4, Everett recorded four solo tackles before leaving the Redskins' 29–20 loss at the Kansas City Chiefs in the third quarter after sustaining a hamstring injury. He was sidelined for the next two weeks due to the injury (Weeks 6–7). On November 23, 2017, Everett earned the start at strong safety after Nicholson sustained a concussion during their 34–31 loss at the New Orleans Saints the previous week. He finished the Redskins' 20–10 victory against the New York Giants with seven combined tackles. He remained the starting strong safety for the remaining six games of the regular season. On December 10, 2017, Everett recorded a season-high 11 combined tackles (six solo) and deflected a pass during a 30–13 loss at the Los Angeles Chargers in Week 14. In Week 17, he collected a season-high seven solo tackles, three assisted tackles, and a pass deflection in the Redskins' 18–10 loss at the New York Giants. He finished the  season with 62 combined tackles (41 solo) and five pass deflections in 14 games and eight starts.

2018–2021
On March 6, 2018, the Washington Redskins signed Everett to a two-year, $2.60 million contract that includes a $250,000 signing bonus.

On November 3, 2019, Everett signed a three-year contract extension with the Redskins through the 2022 season. He was placed on injured reserve on December 7. Before the Week 6 2020 game against the New York Giants, it was announced that Everett would be taking over as the starting free safety over Troy Apke. On December 17, 2020, Everett was placed on injured reserve due to a torn pectoral.

On December 24, 2021, Everett was placed on the team's reserve/non-football injury list after being admitted to a hospital for injuries from a car crash that claimed the life of his girlfriend, who was in the passenger seat. Everett was released from the team on March 16, 2022.

2021 car crash
On December 23, 2021, Everett suffered serious but non-life-threatening injuries in a car crash that claimed the life of his girlfriend, 29-year-old Olivia Peters, who was a passenger in the car. On February 8, 2022, Everett turned himself in after he was served with a warrant for involuntary manslaughter. Everett was released on bond shortly after voluntarily appearing at the Loudoun County Magistrate's office. On July 19, 2022, Everett plead guilty in exchange for a reduced charge for misdemeanor reckless driving and was sentenced to three months house arrest.

References

External links
Texas A&M Aggies bio

1992 births
Living people
American football cornerbacks
American football safeties
Tampa Bay Buccaneers players
Washington Redskins players
People from DeRidder, Louisiana
Players of American football from Louisiana
Texas A&M Aggies football players
Washington Football Team players
Ed Block Courage Award recipients